Johnnie Keyes (February 21, 1940 – June 3, 2018) was an American pornographic film actor.

Keyes had a lead role in Behind the Green Door (1972).  He also performed in films in the Swedish Erotica series during the 1980s. In addition to his work in adult film, Keyes starred in musicals and the theater, was a boxer, a singer, and a sex surrogate. He was a part of the documentary After Porn Ends 2 (2017)

Keyes is a member of the AVN and XRCO Halls of Fame.

Johnnie Keyes died on June 3, 2018 from a stroke at age 78.

References

External links 
 
 
 

1940 births
2018 deaths
African-American pornographic film actors
American male pornographic film actors
20th-century African-American people
21st-century African-American people